Brockville, formerly Elizabethtown, is a city in Eastern Ontario, Canada, in the Thousand Islands region. Although it is the seat of the United Counties of Leeds and Grenville, it is politically independent of the county. It is included with Leeds and Grenville for census purposes only.

Known as the "City of the 1000 Islands", Brockville is located on the north shore of the Saint Lawrence River, about halfway between Kingston to the west and Cornwall to the east. Brockville faces the village of Morristown, New York, on the south side of the river.

Brockville is situated on land that was inhabited by the St. Lawrence Iroquoians and later by the Oswegatchie people. Brockville is one of Ontario's oldest communities established by Loyalist settlers and is named after the British general Sir Isaac Brock.

Tourist attractions in Brockville include the Brockville Tunnel, Fulford Place, and the Aquatarium.

History
Human inhabitation of the upper St. Lawrence River dates at least to the late Middle Woodland period by the Point Peninsula people. Iron oxide pictographs on rock faces have been documented on the Fulford property in Brockville and at Hillcrest west of Brockville. From around 1450 until sometime in the 1500s, the St. Lawrence Iroquoians established a cluster of palisaded agricultural villages in the vicinity of Brockville and Prescott, the Roebuck site being the best known. By 1751, the Oswegatchie people had occupied the north shore of the St. Lawrence between Toniato Creek (now known as Jones Creek, in Thousand Islands National Park) and the Long Sault. After negotiations with the British, they withdrew from the frontage on the north shore of the St. Lawrence in 1784, resettling at what is now Lisbon, New York.

This area of Ontario was first settled by English speakers in 1784, when thousands of American refugees arrived from the American colonies after the American Revolutionary War. They were later called United Empire Loyalists because of their continued allegiance to King George III. The struggle between Britain and the 13 American colonies occurred in the years 1776 to 1783, and seriously divided loyalties among people in some colonies such as New York and Vermont. In many areas traders and merchants, especially in the coastal cities or the northern border regions, had stronger business ties and allegiance to the Crown than did the frontiersmen of the interior. During the six-year war, which ended with the capitulation of the British in 1782, many colonists who remained loyal to the crown were frequently subject to harsh reprisals and unfair dispossession of their property by their countrymen. Many Loyalists chose to flee north to the British colony of Quebec. Great Britain opened the western region of Canada (first known as Upper Canada and now Ontario), purchasing land from First Nations to allocate to the mostly English-speaking Loyalists in compensation for their losses, and helping them with some supplies as they founded new settlements. The first years were very harsh as they struggled on the frontier. Some exiles returned to the United States.

The Saint Lawrence River was named by French explorers in the 18th century to honour the martyred Roman Christian, Saint Lawrence. In 1785, the first Loyalist to take up land, where Brockville is now located, was William Buell Sr. (1751–1832), an ensign disbanded from the King's Rangers, from the state of New York. Residents commonly called the first settlement Buell's Bay.  Around 1810, government officials of Upper Canada assigned the name Elizabethtown for the developing village. However, as this was the name of the surrounding township, the villagers were not satisfied.

During the Summer of 1812, the Hon. Charles Jones, and other leading residents of the village, then known by the misleading name, Elizabethtown, started to refer to the village as Brockville in their correspondence. The commanding British General in Upper Canada and temporary administrator of the province was Major-General Isaac Brock. He was celebrated as the "Hero and Saviour" of Upper Canada because of his recent success in securing the surrender by Americans of Fort Detroit during the first months of the War of 1812–14.

After the surrender of Fort Detroit, General Brock was next involved in other battles on the Niagara Peninsula. On October 13, 1812, he was fatally wounded while leading troops up the heights near the village of Queenston, then temporarily held by American militia.

A raid on Elizabethtown occurred on the early morning of February 7, 1813, when Benjamin Forsyth and 200 of his American forces crossed the frozen Saint Lawrence River, occupied the settlement, seized military and public stores, freed American prisoners, and captured local militia soldiers and leading citizens.

General Brock had learned of the honour being offered by the residents of Elizabethtown but had no chance to give it his official blessing before his death. It took quite a few years for Provincial officials to officially accept the new name, though most residents used it.

By 1830, the population of Brockville exceeded 1000. This entitled it to be represented by its own elected member in the House of Assembly. Henry Jones, the village postmaster, was elected in October 1830 to the 11th Parliament of the Province.

Brockville became Ontario's first incorporated self-governing town on January 28, 1832, two years before the town of Toronto. By means of the Brockville Police Act passed by the Legislative Assembly of Upper Canada, Brockville was granted the right to govern its own affairs, pass laws, and raise taxes. The first elections for the new Board of Police were held on April 2, 1832, when four male citizens were elected to the Police Board. These four, in turn, chose a fifth member, Daniel Jones, who became the first Police Board President (or Mayor) of Brockville.  In March 1836, he became the first native Upper Canadian to receive a knighthood for services to the Crown.

By 1846, the population was 2,111, and there were many buildings made of stone and brick. There was a County Court House and Jail, six churches or chapels, and a steamboat pier for travel to and from Montreal and Kingston. Two newspapers were published, there were two bank agencies and the post office received mail daily. Several court and government departments had offices here. The first industries consisted of one grist mill, four tanneries, two asheries and four wagon makers, in addition to tradesmen of various types.

Later in the 19th century, the town developed as a local centre of industry, including shipbuilding, saddleries, tanneries, tinsmiths, a foundry, a brewery, and several hotels. By 1854, a patent medicine industry had sprung up in Brockville and in Morristown, New York, across the Saint Lawrence River, featuring such products as Dr Morse's Indian Root Pills, Dr. McKenzie's Worm Tablets, and later, Dr. Williams' Pink Pills for Pale People.

In 1855, Brockville was chosen as a divisional point of the new Grand Trunk Railway between Montreal and Toronto. This contributed to its growth, as it could offer jobs in railway maintenance and related fields. At the same time, the north–south line of the Brockville and Ottawa Railway was built to join the timber trade of the Ottawa Valley with the Saint Lawrence River ship route. A well-engineered tunnel for this railway was dug and blasted underneath the middle of Brockville. Completed in December 1860, the Brockville Tunnel was the first railway tunnel built in Canada.

Brockville and many other towns in Canada West were targets of the threatened Fenian invasion after the American Civil War ended in 1865. In June 1866, the Irish-American Brotherhood of Fenians invaded Canada. They launched raids across the Niagara River into Canada West (Ontario) and from Vermont into Canada East (Quebec). Canadian Prime Minister John A. Macdonald called upon the volunteer militia companies in every town to protect Canada. The Brockville Infantry Company and the Brockville Rifle Company (now The Brockville Rifles) were mobilized. The unsuccessful Fenian Raids were a catalyst that contributed to the creation of the new confederated Canada in 1867.

By 1869, Brockville had a population of 5000 and a passenger station on the Grand Trunk Railway. It was the County Town of the United Counties of Leeds and Grenville and a Port of Entry. Steamboats stopped in Brockville daily while plying among Montreal, Kingston, Toronto and Hamilton. The Brockville and Ottawa Railway connected Brockville with Smith's Falls, Perth, Almonte, Carleton Place and Sandy Point. During the summer, a steam ferry plied every half-hour between Brockville and Morristown, New York.

In 1962, Brockville was granted official status as a city. Its coat of arms featured a beehive surrounded by a golden chain and bears the motto Industria, Intelligentia, Prosperitas. This is an official heraldic design.  Brockville is one of the few Canadian cities to have a recognized heraldic flag.

Climate
Brockville experiences a Humid continental climate (Dfb).

Transportation and communications
Highway 401 runs through Brockville, with exits at Leeds & Grenville County Road 29 and North Augusta Road. There are several daily Via Rail connections at Brockville station to Montreal, Toronto and Ottawa along the Corridor.

The town has a municipal airport (Brockville Regional Tackaberry Airport) in the neighbouring Elizabethtown-Kitley Township. The Ottawa Macdonald–Cartier International Airport is approximately 100 km away.

Brockville Transit is the city-operated public transit system which covers the urban area, providing three regular scheduled bus routes and paratransit services, from Monday to Saturday.

Economy

Brockville is home to several large industrial manufacturers. 3M operates four factories in Brockville, manufacturing tape and occupational health and safety products. Procter & Gamble manufactured dryer sheets and cleaning products from the brands their brands Bounce and Swiffer respectively, employing 600 people, however, operations began to slow down in 2017 until the closure of the plant in 2020 and all operations of the plant being moved to locations in West Virginia. In January 2022, the Canadian food company Leclerc, a brand known for making dessert products announced it would be moving into the vacant P&G plant. Other industries include ceiling fan manufacturer Canarm, pharmaceutical manufacturer Trillium Canada, and the oil-blending plant of Shell Canada. Canadian retailer Giant Tiger has also opened a distribution centre for frozen food in Brockville. Some area residents are employed at the Invista Canada facility (formerly DuPont Canada Ltd.) in Maitland, just east of Brockville.

Brockville is also the main administrative, health-care and commercial centre for Leeds—Grenville county. The Upper Canada District School Board, has its headquarters in Brockville. The Brockville General Hospital is embarking on a major expansion project. The Brockville Mental Health Centre is located east of Brockville.

Demographics

Tourism

Brockville, known as The City of the Thousand Islands, is located on the shore of the Saint Lawrence River. The city has revitalized its downtown area, enhancing a waterfront open to the public with parks and walking trails, and numerous shopping locations are found throughout the city. The city is an outdoor museum of architecture, with hundreds of fine buildings on its streets, from all historical periods.

The Aquatarium at Tall Ships Landing, operates the Tourism Office or Visitor Information Centre at 6 Broad Street, 12 months a year, along with a small outlet on Blockhouse Island during the Summer season. both are close to the south end of the Brockville Tunnel, Canada's first railway tunnel. Closed in 1970, it was acquired by the City of Brockville in 1982, and the tunnel reopened in August 2017 as an LED illuminated pedestrian tunnel with music.

The Aquatarium, is an interactive discovery centre about the ecology and history of the 1000 Islands region, opened in March 2016. It is located at the bottom of Broad Street next to the Tall Ships Landing, a condominium project. Both overlook the Saint Lawrence River.

The classically designed Brockville Court House, built in 1842–43, and set in its surrounding central Court House Square, stands as the most impressive of all Brockville's 19th Century architectural structures. It was designed by Toronto architect, John G. Howard. Howard is known to have designed 3 buildings in Brockville.

The Fulford Place house museum was built in 1899-1901 for Senator George Taylor Fulford at 287 King Street East in Brockville's east end. His palatial home was built on his success in marketing patent medicines, including Dr. Williams' Pink Pills for Pale People around the world. He was one of the area's richest industrialists before his untimely death in 1905. The house owned and operated by the Ontario Heritage Trust is open for public tours on a seasonal schedule.

The Brockville Museum, situated in the historic downtown core, at 5 Henry Street, features exhibits and artifacts related to Brockville's rich history and the city's development as a waterfront community.

The John H. Fulford Memorial Fountain was erected in 1917.

1000 Islands Cruises out of Brockville are offered by 1000 Islands and Seaway Cruises offering scenic cruises on the Saint Lawrence River.

The Brockville area is the launching point for underwater wreck diving on sunken ships discovered in the Saint Lawrence, and a number of dive operators take divers to these sites. In 2014, the City of Brockville started a collaboration with S.O.S. (Save Ontario Shipwrecks) to launch an underwater Sculpture Park off of Centeen Park. New sculptures are added annually. (Since the early 1990s underwater visibility had increased, due to effects of the invasive species zebra mussels.)

Brockville was named one of Canada's safest communities by the World Health Organization.

Brockville boating
Brockville's boating resources include a Municipal Harbour and public marina, a Yacht Club and several commercial marinas. Upstream is the Brockville-owned Islands group, which contain some city island parks, as well as an island park belonging to the Thousand Islands National Park system.

The next closest commercial boating facilities are each about a half-day boat-trip away (at displacement speeds), downstream at Prescott, Ontario and upstream at Rockport, Ontario.

Culture

The city has several music, art and dance organizations, such as the Brockville Artists Studio Association, the Brockville Community Choir, the Brockville Concert Association, the Brockville Musicians' Association, the Brockville Operatic Society, the Brockville Theatre Guild, the Uppity Improv Society the City of Brockville Pipes & Drums, and the Thousand Islanders Chorus.

The Brockville Concert Band arises from a long tradition of community and military bands in Brockville. Civic bands provided entertainment at public venues such as community picnics and outdoor skating rinks. The Brockville Rifles Reserve Band entertained "on the green" in the 1930s and 40s.

Military band members returning from the Second World War formed the Brockville Civic Band. Re-organized as the Brockville Concert Band in 1974, it inherited a musical tradition (and sheet music) from civic and military bands dating back to the turn of the 20th century. The Brockville Concert Band used to play a series of summer concerts every second Tuesday in Hardy Park in Brockville within view of the Saint Lawrence River. The band also plays for various civic functions and entertains at charitable fundraising events. The band's musical director and conductor is now co-conducted by Judy Quick and Christopher Coyea.

St. Lawrence College in Brockville is home to the Music Theatre - Performance Program which trains students to enter the professional world of musical theatre. SLC Stage produces three professional-quality musicals each season at the Brockville Arts Centre. The Brockville Arts Centre is a 700-seat theatre venue with a full season of entertainment offerings.

Several festivals occur each year.

Local media

Print

The city's main daily newspaper is The Recorder & Times.

A free monthly magazine called Snapd 1000 Islands is also available around the city.

Radio stations licensed to operate in Brockville

Television
 YourTV  Brockville (Cogeco)
 CKWS-TV  Kingston

Sports

Basketball

The Brockville youth basketball teams, the Brockville Blues and the Brockville Blazers, provide basketball coaching and training for boys and girls across the area. The Blues and Blazers have repeatedly placed in the Ontario Basketball Association (OBA) championships. A female basketball player, Stacey Dales (a graduate of Thousand Islands Secondary School), has gone on to play for the University of Oklahoma Sooners, coming in a close second for the NCAA title in her graduating year. She also has the highest Canadian woman's draft pick for the WNBA, where she has played for the Washington Mystics and Chicago Sky. She has worked for ESPN and the NFL Network.

Rowing

Several local clubs, organizations and high schools have achieved success on provincial, national, and international levels, such as the Brockville Rowing Club, one of the oldest and most successful rowing clubs in Canada. The Rowing Club has captured the Royal Canadian Henley Championships several times. The club has also sent crews to London, England where they have won several Henley Women's Regatta titles. This success often comes by competition against clubs from much larger Canadian centers such as Toronto, Montreal, and Vancouver. Close to 50 Brockville Area Youth are offered an opportunity to participate in a national level rowing program annually. The club has also sent athletes to cities across Europe and Asia to compete at international regattas as part of the Canadian National Team.

Track and field

Thousand Islands Secondary School is home to a strong high school track & field and cross-country running program. The Pirates have captured numerous Canadian championships and have won 5 straight overall provincial (OFSAA) Ontario championships in track & field and cross country running in an association of over 1000 schools since 2004. With over 15 former students on NCAA athletic track & field scholarships in the United States, TISS has been awarded over $1,000,000 in student athletic scholarships. The TISS team travels all over North America including Ohio, Florida, New Hampshire, and British Columbia, consistently winning major international championships. The accomplishments of the school have inspired the community to construct a $1.5 million athletic centre at the school.

Hockey

The Brockville Braves are a Tier I Junior "A" ice hockey team representing Brockville. They are a part of the Central Junior A Hockey League.

Founded in 1963, the Brockville Braves are the second oldest team that has never ceased operation in CJHL history—second only to Pembroke. In the 1979, the teams was the focus of national attention when they were left homeless due to their arena collapsing. This did not stop the Braves though, playing their home games out of Cardinal and Rockland, Ontario, the Braves did not miss a beat.

It took until 1986 for the Brockville Braves to win a CJHL championship. They clinched the Bogart Cup on a late April night, defeating their nemesis Pembroke Lumber Kings 8–7 in the finals. Braves' goalie Jacques Breault was the hero, as with 22 seconds to go in the game, turned away a penalty shot by the league's all-time leading scorers Luc Chabot. Although losing to Orillia, Ontario in the Ontario playdowns, the team was a memorable one. Notable members of this team were all-time Braves leading scorer Larry Mitchell, Breault, Paul Duford, Tim Dubas, Dan Nummikoski, Steve Rachwal, Chad Badawey and Rob White.

Since that championship, the team has experienced more bad times than good. In the late 1980s and early 1990s, the Braves failed to make the playoffs multiple times.

In 1997, times began to change for the better again. The Braves were given the duty of hosting the Fred Page Cup, the Eastern Canadian Junior "A" championship. This allowed their team to compete in the event and give them the experience they needed for the next season. The Braves regained their league title in 1998, bringing the club around full circle. The team also hosted and won the 2010 Fred Page Cup by defeating the Pembroke Lumber Kings 5–1. The Braves are the second host team to win, since the 1998–99 Charlottetown Abbies, who defeated the CCHL's Hawkesbury Hawks 2–0 at the Charlottetown Civic Centre. 

Star graduates Bryan Murray (Barry's Bay, Ontario) Mike Daoust (Brockville, Ontario) and Guy Come (Iroquois Falls, Ontario) of the Brockville Braves won the 2001 NCAA National Championship with the Plattsburgh Cardinals vs the RIT Tigers.

In November 2017, at Rotary Park, they dug the grounds and built their new skating rink with bathroom and change rooms. 
On January 9, 2020, they named the building after P&G so the name of this skating rink is P&G Pavillion, as P&G Brockville is their biggest sponsor.

Baseball
Brockville Bunnies Youth Baseball Program is also an elite level program that operates out of this small city, with provincial championships and several pro and Olympic graduates. Brockville was home to a minor league baseball team that competed in the Canadian–American League in 1936 and 1937, known as the Brockville Pirates for one season and then as the Brockville Blues.

Golf

There are several golf courses in the Brockville area for a variety of skill levels. Sunnidel Golf is a par three course designed for an easy-going round. The Brockville Highlands is a full-length 18 hole course. The course has a small membership and is open to patrons willing to pay green fees. The Brockville Country Club poses greater difficulty to the average golfer. The membership comprises an older demographic and is semi-private. The course is open to green fees however certain playing restrictions are imposed.

Automobile racing

The Brockville Ontario Speedway (The BOS) is a clay oval track just north of the city on Highway 29 in Forthton. The track races every Saturday night from May to September. Classes that race every week include Rookies, Street Stock, Sportsman, Modified, and Vintage.

Rugby

The Brockville Privateers R.F.C. was formed in 1993, reestablishing a local rugby club in the area. Rugby has been played in Brockville area as far back as 1899. The original Brockville Rugby Football Club eventually became part of Brockville Collegiate Institute (BCI). Brockville Rugby now includes multiple men's and women's teams along with a strong junior age grade program.

Swimming

The Upper Canada Swim Club (The River Otters) runs competitive teams for children and young adults.
The YMCA Brockville runs competitive teams for children and young adults

Education
Brockville has a community college, four high schools, and several elementary schools.

Community colleges
St. Lawrence College (Brockville Campus) has an enrolment of around 800. St. Lawrence College was recently ranked number one in Ontario for graduate employment rate.

High schools
Académie catholique Ange-Gabriel is a French Catholic school (Grades JK-12) and has an enrolment of approximately 282 students.

Brockville Collegiate Institute has an enrolment of approximately 560 and has strong academic, theatre, and sports programs. St. Mary Catholic High School is the English Catholic school and has around 600 students.

The Fulford Academy is a private boarding school for international students grades 7–10.

Thousand Islands Secondary School has an enrolment of approximately 1000 and is both a university and college preparatory school with strong technology facilities. It is also known for its athletics programs including: track and field, women's basketball, men's soccer, and cross country running.

Elementary schools
Public elementary schools in the city include Commonwealth Public School, Westminster Public School, Toniata Public School, and Vanier Public School.

The Catholic English elementary schools are St. Francis Xavier, St. John Bosco and James L. Jordan.

Académie Catholique Ange-Gabriel is a French-language Catholic school serving JK - Grade 12.

Heritage Community Christian School, 20 minutes from downtown Brockville, is a privately funded Christian school offering pre-school through grade 8 in a Christian environment.

Notable people

Brad Abraham - screenwriter of Stonehenge Apocalypse and Robocop: Prime Directives; graduate of Brockville Collegiate Institute
George Chaffey - civil engineer and urban planner; founder of Ontario, California, a sister city of Brockville
William Chaffey - civil engineer and urban planner; brother of George Chaffey
Brian Chapman - AHL All-Star
William Everett Chipman - Wisconsin State Senator
Burke Dales - CFL punter; player with Calgary Stampeders
Stacey Dales - WNBA AllStar and ESPN broadcaster
Joan Erikson - author, educator, craftsperson, and dance ethnographer; wife of Erik Erikson
Todd Gill - NHL player and owner of the CJHL Brockville Braves
Ben Hutton - ice hockey player for the Los Angeles Kings
Walter William LaChance - architect and author in the early 20th century
Randy Ladouceur - NHL player and coach
Hank Lammens - professional hockey player
Cyril Leeder - Ottawa Senators hockey team president
Robert Henry Lindsay - painter
John Matheson - Member of Parliament and judge; moved to Brockville as an adult
Alyn McCauley - player with Toronto Maple Leafs
James Motluk - documentary filmmaker who graduated from Thousand Islands Secondary School in 1981
Portia Perez - women's professional wrestler
Rachel Perry - former MuchMusic VJ and host on VH1
Nathan Phillips - Mayor of Toronto
Shon Seung-wan - singer from South Korean girl group Red Velvet
Randy Sexton - general manager of the Ottawa Senators and St. Lawrence University alumnus
Frances Ford Seymour - mother of Jane Fonda and Peter Fonda, wife of Henry Fonda
Kelly Thornton - theatre director

Sister city
 Ontario, California, United States

Notes

References
 Robert B. Shaw. History of the Comstock Patent Medicine Business
 Holbrook, Stewart (1959). Golden Age of Quackery. New York: The Macmillan Company, 1959.
 Leavitt, Thad. W. H., (1879). History of Leeds and Grenville, Ontario, from 1749 to 1879. Recorder Press, 1879. Online at Canada's Local Histories Web Site, "Our Roots/Nos Racines".
 Douglas M. Grant, (1979).  Discovering Old Brockville, the Historic Core. The Brockville Foundation, 1979. (Out of print).

External links

 

 
Cities in Ontario
Ontario populated places on the Saint Lawrence River
Single-tier municipalities in Ontario